François Gelez (born January 15, 1979 in Tyrosse) is a former French international rugby union player, who previously played as a fly-half for SU Agen.

Gelez has played for France, making his debut on November 10, 2001 against South Africa. He was also part of the team that won the Grand Slam in 2002.

Notes

1979 births
French rugby union players
Living people
France international rugby union players
Rugby union fly-halves